George of Evdokias (born Georg Wagner; March 10, 1930 in Berlin, Germany – April 6, 1993 in Paris) was an Eastern Orthodox archbishop who led the Patriarchal Exarchate for Orthodox Parishes of Russian Tradition in Western Europe from 1981 to 1993, under the jurisdiction of the Ecumenical Patriarchate of Constantinople.

Having studied theology at the St. Sergius Orthodox Theological Institute in Paris (where he later served as a professor),  he was ordained in 1955 into the Russian Orthodox Church for service in that city.

He became a monk, and archimandrite. In October 1971 he was consecrated as Bishop of Evdokias (titular see), and appointed assistant bishop to Archbishop George Tarassov. In May 1981, he was elected to be the successor of Archbishop George as head of the exarchate, and was granted the title of Archbishop.

Рainful illness that occurred during the summer of 1992, a varicose vein, did not allow him to resume the courses of his last academic year. Bishop George who was no longer able to stand, went through the most difficult tests for the bishop, the theologian and the liturgist, for he could no longer celebrate the liturgy. Overcoming the pain, of which he never complained, he had to preside over the Eucharistic liturgy in the cathedral on the feast of the Holy Encounter on February 15, 1993. He died April 6, 1993.

References

Sources

External links
Orthodox Wiki Georges (Wagner) of Evdokia
Picture

Archbishops of Orthodox parishes of Russian tradition in Western Europe
Converts to Eastern Orthodoxy from Protestantism
1930 births
1993 deaths
20th-century Eastern Orthodox archbishops
Eastern Orthodox Christians from Germany
German expatriates in France